Štorje is a village in the Municipality of Sežana in the Littoral region of Slovenia.

Church

The local church is dedicated to John the Baptist and belongs to the Parish of Povir.

References

External links

Štorje on Geopedia

Populated places in the Municipality of Sežana